State Highways in India are stretches with heavy traffic intensity of more than 10,000 Passenger Car Units (PCUs) but less than 30,000 PCUs which connects district headquarters, important towns and the National Highways in the state and neighboring states. The Construction & Maintenance wing of the Highways Department manages construction and maintenance of all the State Highways (SH), major district roads (MDR), and other district roads (ODR). The Tamil Nadu State Highways Network has eight circles: Chennai, Villupuram, Madurai, Salem, Tiruchirappalli, Coimbatore, Tiruppur and Tirunelveli.

The state has a total of 286 state highways, 161 state highways urban (SH-U) stretches and 905 major district roads (MDRs), apart from other district roads (ODRs).

List of State Highways 
List of State highways in Tamil Nadu (as of March 2019).

SH1 to SH50

SH51 to SH100

SH 101 to SH 150

SH151 to SH200

SH201 to SH234

List of State Highways Urban
List of State Highways Urban Stretches in Tamil Nadu (as of March 2019).

SHU to SHU50

SHU51 to SHU100

SHU101 to SHU150

SHU151 to SHU223

See also
 National Highways Authority of India
  District Roads in Tamil Nadu
 National Highways
 List of National Highways in India
 Road Network in Tamil Nadu
 Chennai bypass
 Coimbatore bypass

References

External links
 Government of Tamil Nadu – Highways Department
 Tamil Nadu Highways – Right to information (Chapter-02)
 Maps of TN state highways
 Government of Tamil Nadu – Annual Plan 2008–09

Tamil Nadu-related lists
State Highways